The Pirate Party Luxembourg is a registered political party in Luxembourg. The party follows the pirate political doctrine developed by the Swedish Pirate Party. It champions citizen's rights, improved data protection and privacy for physical persons, more transparency of government, free access to information and education. Beyond this, it calls for an in-depth overhaul of copyright and patent law, and opposes every form of censorship. A fundamental principle is grassroots democracy, which gives the possibility to each member to help shape the future of the party. Like most parties in Luxembourg, the Pirate Party is vigorously pro-European. It is a member of Pirate Parties International, the umbrella organisation of the international Pirate Party movement.

The Pirate Party Luxembourg was founded in Luxemburg City on 4 October 2009. Its membership evolved from 14 founding-members to 331 (in April, 2014).

From 2009 to 2018, Sven Clement was the President and the main candidate for the general elections in 2013 and the European elections in 2014. The vice-president was Sven Wohl, the treasurer was Ben Allard and the general secretary was Andy Maar. Another prominent figure was Jerry Weyer, former vice-president and co-founder of the party who was also co-president of Pirate Parties International (PPI) from March 2010 to 2011. The current co-speakers of the party are Starsky Flor and Rebecca Lau.

Election results

References

External links

 

!
Luxembourg
Political parties in Luxembourg
Political parties established in 2009
2009 establishments in Luxembourg
Direct democracy parties
Internet in Europe
Pro-European political parties